Unfit to Practise is the second album from the parody duo Amateur Transplants.

Production

The Amateur Transplants released their first album Fitness to Practice in 2004. The band received little attention however until 2005 when their song from their debut album, London Underground, a parody of Going Underground by The Jam, went viral, receiving millions of views on YouTube. From 2005 the duo began to write many more songs for the second album, in 2007 they sang many of these for the first time on their live tour, The Black and White Menstrual Tour. The album was then released on CD in 2008 to little attention however in 2010 it was released on Spotify , iTunes and Amazon.com, three songs from the album now have over 50,000 plays on Spotify.

Track listing
All songs written by Adam Kay and Suman Biswas.

"Masochism Tango 2008" (1:59)
"Anaesthetist's Hymn" (1:48)
"Sheila's Wheels" (1:08)
"Finals Fantasy" (4:36)
"Beautiful Song" (3:05)
"King of the Dead" (0:45)
"New Man Song" (2:01)
"Libel Case" (0:56)
"Paediatrics" (1:03)
"Information Technology" (0:49)
"Department of Surgery" (1:12)
"Respiratory Clinic A" (0:55)
"Respiratory Clinic B" (0:20)
"Urology Clinic A" (0:48)
"Urology Clinic B" (0:29)
"Nutrition Clinic A" (0:53)
"Nutrition Clinic B" (0:56)
"Sleep Studies" (0:58)
"Psychiatry" (1:13)
"Gynaecology" (0:53)
"Phobia Medicine" (0:21)
"Well Man Clinic" (1:05)
"Learning Difficulties" (0:25)
"Geriatrics" (0:53)
"Medical School Finance" (0:44)
"Medical School Admissions" (0:48)
"Couples Counselling A" (1:36)
"Couples Counselling B" (0:44)
"Couples Counselling C" (0:47)
"Couples Counselling D" (1:25)
"I Am What I Am" [Bonus track] (2:03)
"London Underground" [Bonus track] (2:04)

Parody information
Masochism Tango 2008 - The Masochism Tango by Tom Lehrer
Anaesthetist's Hymn - Total Eclipse of the Heart by Bonnie Tyler
Sheila's Wheels - Theme music from the UK Sheilas' Wheels television advertisements
Finals Fantasy - I Know Him So Well by Barbara Dickson and Elaine Paige from Chess
Beautiful Song - You're Beautiful by James Blunt
King of the Dead - Bad Day by Daniel Powter
New Man Song - I'm like a Bird by Nelly Furtado
Libel Case - Grace Kelly by Mika
Paediatrics - Patience by Take That
Information Technology - 9 to 5 by Dolly Parton
Department of Surgery - Complicated by Avril Lavigne
Respiratory Clinic A - Easy by Commodores
Respiratory Clinic B - The Girl From Ipanema by Astrud Gilberto
Urology Clinic A - Ob-La-Di, Ob-La-Da by The Beatles
Urology Clinic B - Walk Like an Egyptian by The Bangles
Nutrition Clinic A - Cannonball by Damien Rice
Nutrition Clinic B - Hallelujah - by Leonard Cohen
Sleep Studies - In Your Eyes by Kylie Minogue
Psychiatry - Sit Down by James
Gynaecology - Tiny Dancer by Elton John
Phobia Medicine - Survivor by Destiny's Child
Well Man Clinic - Don't Know Why by Norah Jones
Learning Difficulties - She's Electric by Oasis
Geriatrics - Girl All the Bad Guys Want by Bowling for Soup
Medical School Finance - Son of a Preacher Man by Dusty Springfield
Medical School Admissions - You Gotta Be by Des'ree
Couples Counselling A - Sorry Seems to Be the Hardest Word by Elton John and Bernie Taupin
Couples Counselling B - Build Me Up Buttercup by The Foundations
Couples Counselling C - Breakfast at Tiffany's by Deep Blue Something
Couples Counselling D - The Bare Necessities from The Jungle Book
I Am What I Am - I Am What I Am from La Cage aux Folles
London Underground Remix - Going Underground by The Jam (A new version of London Underground as included on Fitness to Practice album with a significant change to the lyric to include a reference to the 7/7 Underground bomb attacks)

References

2008 albums
Amateur Transplants albums